Lisa Ortiz  is an American voice actress and voice director. She is best known for her roles in English anime adaptations, such as Lina Inverse in Slayers and Amy Rose in Sonic X. She voiced Amy Rose in the mainline and spin-off Sonic the Hedgehog video games from 2005 to 2010. She's also the voice director (since 2016) for the English dub of the Pokémon anime in addition to performing various roles since the first season. In 2021, she reprised Tao Jun in the Netflix anime Shaman King.

Career
Lisa has appeared in titles for SDI Media, NYAV Post, 4Kids Entertainment, Central Park Media, Headline Studios, TAJ Productions, and DuArt Film and Video. 

At the 2002 Katsucon in National Harbor, Maryland, Lisa admitted that her start in voice overs came from her brother stealing her car, which led to series of adventures that led her to meeting a friend to retrieve the car, who then invited her to a casting call for Record of Lodoss War.

Ortiz is the President of Noise of O Productions, LLC, an audio post house and has directed for games and animation, including Modern Combat 5 and Super 4.

Filmography

Anime dubbing
 Accel World – Nickel Doll
 Alphablocks – M, O, P, V, W, Y
 Animation Runner Kuromi – Mikiko "Kuromi" Oguro
 Arcade Gamer Fubuki – Chizuru
 Aria – Ai Aino
 Arte – Daphne
 Battle Arena Toshinden – Ellis
 Battle Game in 5 Seconds – Mion
 Battle Skipper – Saori Tachibana
 Blue Gender – Alicia Whistle
 Boogiepop Phantom – Saki Yoshisawa
 Comic Party – Chisa Tsukamoto, Minami Makimura
 Descendants of Darkness – Maria Wong
 Full Dive – Queen Govern
 Gall Force: Eternal Story – Eluza, Pony
 Gall Force: New Era – Garnet
 Geobreeders – Sanae
 His and Her Circumstances – Tsubasa Shibahime
 Ikki Tousen – Kaku Bunwa 
 Kujibiki Unbalance – Kaoruko Yamada
 JoJo's Bizarre Adventure: Stone Ocean – Prisoner
 Legend of Himiko – Koran
 Magical DoReMi – Patina, Penny
 Magic User's Club – Nanaka Nakatomi
 Mobile Suit Gundam SEED – Natarle Badgiruel (NYAV Post dub)
 My Hero Academia — Burnin
 Now and Then, Here and There – LaLa Ru
 Numberblocks – Ten (US Version with Korrina's voice in 2021)
  One Piece - Tony Tony Chopper (4kids)
 Pokémon – Oshawott, Korrina, Litten, others
 Queen's Blade series – Melona (credited as Darla Chaney Seasons 1–2 and the OVA, credited as Trina Hilbe Season 3), Echidna 
 Rayearth OVA – Fuu Hououji
 Record of Lodoss War – Deedlit
 Revolutionary Girl Utena – Shiori Takatsuki
 Samurai Deeper Kyo – Mika
 Shadow Star Narutaru – Jun Ezumi
 Shaman King – Jun Tao, Soumei Tao 
 Slayers – Lina Inverse
 Slayers Evolution-R – Lina Inverse
 Slayers Next – Lina Inverse
 Slayers Revolution – Lina Inverse
 Slayers Try – Lina Inverse
 Sonic X – Amy Rose
 Space Pirate Mito – Mito, Ranban in Exo-suit
 Tama and Friends – Chopin 
 That Time I Got Reincarnated as a Slime - Frey
 The Irresponsible Captain Tylor – Azalyn, Emi, Yumi Hanner
 ToHeart – Tomoko Hoshina
 Twin Signal – Kris Sign
 Virgin Fleet – Hatsuki Fujiwara, Mari Sakisaka
 The World of Narue – Kiriri Kaibashira, Kyouko Kudo, Manaka Oatari/Magical Girl #4
 Yu-Gi-Oh! – Serenity Wheeler
 Yu-Gi-Oh! GX – Mindy, Linda, Yasmin, Maiden in Love, Elemental HERO Burstinatrix
 Yu-Gi-Oh! 5D's – Patty, Claire, Barbara
 Yu-Gi-Oh! ZEXAL II – Lotus Hanazoe
 Zetman – Tomomi, Swim Teacher (Ep. 5)

Animation
 44 Cats – Jumpy, Gaby, Astricat, Sandy, Ginny, others
 Angel's Friends – Miki, Cabiria
 Cubix: Robots for Everyone – Babysix
 Chaotic – Lulu
 Chaotic: Secrets of the Lost City – Unda, Servant of Water
 Little & Big Monsters - Amanda
 Ratatoing – Carol
 Teenage Mutant Ninja Turtles – Jhanna
The Little Cars in Rodopolis Adventures – Cris Crash
The Little Cars 3: Fast and Furious– Cris Crash
 Viva Piñata – Mrs. Whirlm, Betty Bunnycomb
 Winx Club – Musa, Icy, Digit, Mitzi (all 4kids dub, seasons 1-3), Griselda (3Beep dub, season 8), others

Movies
 Adolescence of Utena – Shiori Takatsuki, Shadow Girl E-ko
 Berserk: The Golden Age Arc – Anna
 Exte: Hair Extensions – Yuko Mizushima 
 Galaxy Express 999 Eternal Fantasy - Maetel
 Impy's Island – Ping
 Impy's Wonderland – Ping
 Time of Eve – Rina
 Kikoriki. Team Invincible - Rosa
 Adventures in Voice Acting – Herself
 The Fairy Princess & the Unicorn - Ophira
 One piece Film: Red - Sunny-kun

Video games
 Fire Emblem Heroes - Eremiya
 Fire Emblem Warriors: Three Hopes - Additional voices
 Grand Theft Auto: Vice City – Pedestrian, Commercial Announcer
 Shaman King: Power of Spirit – Tao Jun 
 Smite – Izanami
 Sonic the Hedgehog – Amy Rose (2005–2010)
 PokéPark 2: Wonders Beyond – Oshawott
 Street Fighter V – Noembelu
 Octopath Traveler – Dancers
 Goddess of Victory: NIKKE – Ether & Dolla

Web
 Sonic and Tails R – Amy Rose

Production credits

Voice director
 Asphalt Overdrive
 Brothers in Arms 3: Sons of War
 Dragon Mania Legends
 Dungeon Hunter 5
 Modern Combat 5: Blackout
 Norm of the North
 Pokémon (Season 19+/Movie 18+)
 Psychic School Wars

References

External links
 Website
 
 
 

Living people
American stage actresses
American voice actresses
Hofstra University alumni
Hispanic and Latino American actresses
20th-century American actresses
21st-century American actresses
Place of birth missing (living people)
American video game actresses
American voice directors
1974 births